Mian Ijaz Hussain Bhatti is a Pakistani politician who had been a member of the Provincial Assembly of the Punjab from August 2018 till January 2023.

Early life and education
He was born on 17 July 1953 in Sangla Hill Tehsil, Pakistan.

He has received intermediate-level education.

Political career

He was elected to the Provincial Assembly of the Punjab as a candidate of Pakistan Muslim League (N) from Constituency PP-131 (Nankana Sahib-I) in 2018 Pakistani general election.

References

Living people
Pakistan Muslim League (N) MPAs (Punjab)
1953 births